Dghweɗe (also known as Hude, Johode, Traude, Dehoxde, Tghuade, Toghwede, Wa'a, Azaghvana, Zaghvana) is a Chadic language spoken in Borno State, Nigeria in the Gwoza LGA.

Notes

References
 Esther Frick.  1977.  The Phonology of Dghwede.  Language Data, African Series, 11.  Dallas:  Summer Institute of Linguistics.

Biu-Mandara languages
Languages of Nigeria